Tetragonoderus intermedius is a species of beetle in the family Carabidae. It was described by Solsky in 1874.

References

intermedius
Beetles described in 1874